The 2007 Aberdeen City Council election took place on 3 May 2007 to elect members of Aberdeen City Council, at the same time as the Scottish Parliament general election. The election was the first one using 13 new wards created as a result of the Local Governance (Scotland) Act 2004, with each ward electing three or four councillors using the single transferable vote system a form of proportional representation. The new wards replaced 43 single-member wards, which used the plurality (first past the post) system of election.

The results saw the council remain under no overall control.

Election results

Ward results

Changes since 2007 Election
† In March 2012, Bridge of Don Cllr John Reynolds resigned from the Liberal Democrats and now sits as an Independent.
†† In January 2011, Tillydrone/Seaton/Old Aberdeen Cllr Norman Collie resigned from the Labour Party and now sits as an Independent.
††† In June 2011, Hazlehead/Ashley/Queens Cross Cllr Jim Farquaharson was expelled from the Conservative Party and now sits as an Independent.
†††† In June 2011, Lower Deeside Cllr Alan Milne was expelled from the Conservative Party and now sits as an Independent.
††††† In September 2011, Bridge of Don Cllr Gordon Leslie was suspended from the Liberal Democrats. He subsequently resigned from the party and now sits as an Independent.
†††††† In February 2012, George Street/Harbour Cllr Jim Hunter was suspended from the Labour Party. He subsequently resigned from the party and now sits as an Independent.

By-Elections since 3 May 2007
A by-election was held in the Midstocket/Rosemount Ward following the death of the Conservatives' John Porter on 23 May 2007. The by-election was won by the SNP's John Corall on 16 August 2007

A by-election was held in the Dyce/Bucksburn/Danestone Ward following the death of the Liberal Democrats' Ron Clark on 21 February 2011. The by-election was won by the SNP's Neil MacGregor on 19 May 2011

A by-election was held in the Airyhall/Broomhill/Garthdee Ward following the resignation of the Liberal Democrats' Scott Cassie on 27 April 2011 after he was jailed for embezzlement. The by-election was won by the SNP's Gordon Scott Townson on 23 June 2011.

References

2007
2007 Scottish local elections
21st century in Aberdeen